Archib is a village in Southern Dagestan, Russia near the Azerbaijani border. It is the central village of the Archi people, who speak Archi.

It is a centre of Archibsky selsoviet in Charodinsky District. The postal code is 368457.

External links 
 The Archi Language Page of the Surrey Morphology Group, which includes a photograph of the village.

Rural localities in Charodinsky District